Ninaivellam Nithya is a 1982 Indian Tamil-language romance film written and directed by C. V. Sridhar. The film stars Karthik and newcomer Gigi. It was released on 18 June 1982.

Plot 
Chandru, a young and carefree guy visits an estate on a hill region along with his friend Thyagu. He meets Nithya, a local girl. At first they have a bit of stand offs but eventually both fall in love with each other. At a time, when their love affair is known to the girls' family, the whole village joins hands to separate them, but Chandru and Nithya escape to Chandru's hometown. Chandru was of the opinion that his father, a well to do businessman will support him, but he turns Chandru and Nithya away. Chandru and Nithya temporarily stay in Chandru's another friend. What happens to both of them forms the balance of the story.

Cast 
 Karthik as Chandru
 Gigi as Nithya
 Nizhalgal Ravi as Thyagu
 Nithershan Kugenesan

Production 
Gigi, a daughter of Gemini Ganesan, made her acting debut, and Ninaivellam Nithya was her only film as an actress.

Soundtrack 
The music was composed by Ilaiyaraaja, with lyrics by Vairamuthu. Many of the songs are set in ragas; "Rojavai Thalattum Thendral" is set in Pantuvarali, "Panivizhum Malar Vanam" is in Nattai, "Neethane Enthan Pon Vasantham" is set in Brindavani, and "Kanni Ponnu" is set in Chatusruti Dhaivata.

Tracklist

Reception 
S. Shiva Kumar of Mid-Day wrote, "Karthik's sensitive performance and Ilayaraja's soothing music save the film from being a total washout. Gigi makes a very unsure debut and looks uncomfortable throughout."

Legacy 
The song "Neethane Enthan Pon Vasantham"  inspired the titles of a 2012 film (Neethaane En Ponvasantham) and a 2020 TV series, while "Panivizhum Malarvanam" inspired the name of a 2014 film.

References

External links 
 

1980s romance films
1980s Tamil-language films
1982 films
Films directed by C. V. Sridhar
Films scored by Ilaiyaraaja
Films with screenplays by C. V. Sridhar
Indian romance films